{{Infobox military unit
| unit_name = 108th Wing
| image =  108th Air Refueling Wing - Operation Joint Forge.jpg | image_size = 300px
| caption = 108th Wing KC-135 Stratotanker at Istres AB, France
|dates=1950–present
|country = 
|allegiance = 
|branch =   Air National Guard
|type = Wing
|role = Composite Air Refueling
|size = 
|command_structure=New Jersey Air National Guard
|garrison=Joint Base McGuire-Dix-Lakehurst
|garrison_label = 
|nickname =  "Jersey Thunder" 
|patron = 
|motto=Victory Through the Sky
|colors = 
|colors_label = 
|march = 
|mascot = 
|equipment = Orange Tail Stripe "New Jersey" in Black
|equipment_label =  Tail Code
| battles =   
| anniversaries = 
| decorations = 
| battle_honours = 
| battle_honours_label = 
| disbanded = 
| flying_hours = 
| website =  http://www.108thwing.ang.af.mil

| commander1 = Colonel Eric A. Guttormsen
| commander1_label = 
| notable_commanders = 

| identification_symbol = 
| identification_symbol_label = 108th Air Refueling Wing emblem
|identification_symbol_2=
|identification_symbol_2_label=108 Fighter-Bomber Wing emblem (approved 15 August 1951)<ref name=Maurer348FG>Maurer, Combat Units, pp. 226–228</ref>

| aircraft_attack = 
| aircraft_bomber = 
| aircraft_fighter = 
| aircraft_interceptor = 
| aircraft_recon = 
| aircraft_transport = C-32B
| aircraft_tanker = KC-135R
}}

The 108th Wing is a unit of the New Jersey Air National Guard, one of the many units stationed at Joint Base McGuire-Dix-Lakehurst, New Jersey. If activated to federal service, the Wing is gained by the United States Air Force Air Mobility Command.

The World War II predecessor unit, 348th Fighter Group, was the most successful P-47 Thunderbolt group in the South West Pacific Theatre. Its commander, Colonel Neel Ernest Kearby was awarded the Medal of Honor for his actions in combat.  Over a dozen of the group's pilots became Flying aces.

Overview
The 108th Wing principal mission is air refueling. The wing enhances the Air Force's capability to accomplish its primary missions of Global Reach and Global Power. It also provides aerial refueling support to Air Force, Navy and Marine Corps aircraft as well as aircraft of allied nations. The wing is also capable of transporting litter and ambulatory patients using patient support pallets during aeromedical evacuations.

In addition to their primary air refueling mission, the Wing also supports an Intelligence Squadron and a Cyber Operations Squadron

Units 
The 108th Wing consists of the following units:
 108th Operations Group
 108th Operations Support Squadron 
 140th Cyber Operations Squadron
 141st Air Refueling Squadron (KC-135R) "New Jersey", Orange Fin Flash
 150th Special Operations Squadron (C-32B) 
 204th Intelligence Squadron

 The 140th Cyber Operations Squadron is one of the twelve Air National Guard Cyber Protection Teams that defend networks and systems against threats.

 The 204th Intelligence Squadron is the first Air National Guard squadron that is solely dedicated to providing intelligence instruction and training products to the Air Mobility Command. It is also the first course of its kind in the intelligence community that integrates active duty, Air National Guard and Air Force Reserve students.

 108th Maintenance Group
 108th Maintenance Squadron
 108th Aircraft Maintenance Squadron
 108th Maintenance Operations Flight
 108th Mission Support Group
 108th Force Support Squadron
 108th Logistics Readiness Squadron
 108th Security Forces Squadron
 108th Communications Flight

The wing operates nine KC-135R Stratotankers and two C-32B Cargo Aircraft.

History
Formation of the 108th Wing
The World War II 348th Fighter Group was redesignated as the 108th Fighter Group and allotted to the New Jersey National Guard on 24 May 1946. It was organized at Newark Municipal Airport and extended federal recognition later that year. Initially, the group reported to the 52d Fighter Wing of the New York National Guard and was supported by the 208th Air Service Group.  In the fall of 1950, the Air National Guard reorganized its combat units under the wing base organization that had been used by the regular Air Force since 1947.  In this reorganization, the 108th Fighter Wing was formed to include the 108th Group and its support elements, organized into the 108th Air Base Group, 108th Maintenance and Supply Group and the 108th Medical Group.

Korean War mobilization
Only a few months after being organized, the unit was called to active federal service on 1 March 1951 and moved to Turner Air Force Base, Georgia, where it was assigned to Strategic Air Command's 40th Air Division.  At Turner it became the 108th Fighter-Bomber Wing in May. In December 1951 it was transferred to Tactical Air Command and moved to Godman Air Force Base, Kentucky where it replaced the 123d Fighter-Bomber Wing, which had moved to England. On 1 December 1952, the wing transferred its mission, personnel and equipment to the 405th Fighter-Bomber Wing and returned to state control.

Return to state control
With return to state control, the wing assumed the air defense mission.  Despite its retention of the fighter bomber designation, it was gained by Air Defense Command (ADC) upon mobilization.  ADC required the squadrons it gained to be designed to augment active duty squadrons capable of performing air defense missions for an indefinite period after mobilization independently of their parent wing. It was not until 1955 that the wing was redesignated the 108th Fighter-Interceptor Wing.  The redesignation coincided with the change from long-range North American P-51H Mustang fighter. designed for the invasion of Japan, the P-51H was the last variant of the P-51 Mustang of World War II, but was produced too late to see any wartime combat. Not used in the Korean War due to it not being believed as rugged as its famous "D model" predecessor, the P-51H was used to equip Air National Guard units in the 1950s as an interceptor.  In 1955, the Mustangs were retired and the squadron entered the jet age, with the arrival of the North American F-86E Sabre.

The 108th FIW was transferred to Tactical Air Command (TAC) in 1958, being re-designated as a Tactical Fighter Wing.  The 141st and 119th Tactical Fighter Squadrons transferred its interceptors and received and F-84F Thunderstreak fighter-bombers.

On 1 October 1961, as a result of the Berlin crisis, the 108th TFW was again ordered to active federal duty.  When activated, the 108th consisted of three squadrons, the 119th TFS at Atlantic City Airport, the 141st TFS McGuire Air Force Base, New Jersey, and the 149th TFS from the Virginia ANG at Byrd Field, near Richmond, Virginia. All three squadrons were flying the F-84F Thunderstreak.

Once activated, the wing was deployed to Chaumont-Semoutiers Air Base, France.  However, only a portion of the 108th TFW deployed to France due to DOD budget limitations. This consisted of 28 F-84F's of the 141st TFS and officers and airmen from all three squadrons, with the remaining aircraft and personnel remaining on active duty at their home stations. The first elements of the 108th deployed to Chaumont from McGuire AFB on 16 October with the last aircraft and personnel arriving on 6 November.  The ground units deployed by sealift, with the deployed elements reaching Chaumont by 17 November.

In France, the deployed elements of the 108th TFW were designated the 7108th Tactical Wing on 20 November due to the reduced strength of the wing in Europe.   The primary mission of the 7108th was to provide close air support to the Seventh Army in Europe under the direction of Ground Forward Air Controllers. To accomplish this mission, up to 30 sorties were flown each day.   Pilots and aircraft were rotated back and forth from Atlantic City and Richmond in order for all pilots in the wing to become familiar with flying conditions at Chaumont and to teach USAFE operational procedures.

The deployment to France ended in October 1962 and the wing returned to New Jersey state control.  The 119th TFS expanded to group size with the activation of the 177th Tactical Fighter Group.   Immediately following this action, their F-84Fs were replaced by North American F-86H Sabres.  The 141st TFS, having left their F-84F's in France, were re-equipped with F-86H's upon their return.

In April 1964, the 108th traded their Sabrejets in for the F-105B "Thunderchief".  the 108th was the first Air National Guard unit to fly twice the speed of sound.  In May 1981, the F-4D Phantom II replaced the F-105s, and in 1985, they were upgraded to the F-4E Phantom II.

In 1989, the 108th was declared the best Air National Guard flying unit and awarded the Spaatz Trophy. It participated in numerous exercises and made six overseas deployments as a fighter unit, to France, Greece, Ecuador and three times to Norway.

Air refueling
With the end of the Cold War, the 108th Tactical Fighter Wing was re-aligned to a KC-135 Stratotanker Air Refueling Wing.  The F-4s were retired and the squadron was redesignated as the 141st Air Refueling Squadron.  Also, as part of the conversion of the wing to the Objective Wing organization, the 108th Tactical Fighter Group became the 108th Operations Group, to which the 141st was assigned.  The 108th received its first Boeing KC-135 Stratotanker (KC-135E) on 27 September. Yet, a scant 69 days later, on 6 December, it flew its first refueling mission. Forty-one days later, on 16 January 1992, it flew its first operational mission – a night, air refueling of an E-3B "Sentry" bound for the Persian Gulf.

1992 was a busy year for the 108th. They flew their first passenger airlift mission on 27 February; its first overseas mission (Costa Rica) on 13 March; its first European mission, Germany 28 May, (South Korea) on 20 July, and its first humanitarian mission on 1 September, (three Stratotankers filled with critically needed supplies to "Hurricane Andrew" (Florida) victims).  The wing was certified combat ready on 3 December 1992. The very next day it was tasked with two missions – its first operational deployment – nothing less than spearheading and establishing the U.S. – Somalia air bridge for Operation Restore Hope. It not only deployed an air refueling detachment to Moron Air Base, Spain, but also airlifted active duty air crews to Cairo West Air Base, Egypt. In January 1993, while deployed at Moron Air Base, Spain, the Wing off loaded its one millionth pound of fuel.

On 1 October 1993, the NJ ANG 170th Air Refueling Group combined with the 108th Air Refueling Wing. The 108th welcomed the 150th Air Refueling Squadron's 37 years experience in airlift and air refueling operations, and its 130,454 accident-free flying hours, recognized as the world's safest flying record.

In September 1994, for over 30 days, five aircraft and 300 members deployed to Pisa, Italy for DENY FLIGHT. The 108th replaced the 126 ARW of the Illinois Air National Guard. Supported by 15 active duty Air Force personnel, the 108th Wing was the first Air National Guard unit to take full responsibility during that period.

May through August 1995, 13 members of the 108th and 170th Clinic deployed to Guantanamo Bay Naval Base, Cuba for a humanitarian mission, Operation Sea Signal.

In 2007, the 108 ARW began retiring its KC-135E aircraft and transitioning to the KC-135R.

Lineage
 Established as the 108th Fighter Wing c. 25 October 1950
 Activated on 1 November 1950
 Federalized and called to active duty on 1 March 1951
 Redesignated 108th Fighter-Bomber Wing on 16 May 1951
 Released from active duty and returned to New Jersey state control on 1 December 1952
 Redesignated 108th Fighter-Interceptor Wing on 1 July 1955
 Redesignated 108th Tactical Fighter Wing (Special Delivery) on 1 July 1958
 Federalized and called to active duty, 1 October 1961
 Federalized deployed components operated as 7108th Tactical Wing
 Released from active duty and returned to New Jersey state control on 30 August 1962
 Redesignated 108th Tactical Fighter Wing 
 Redesignated 108th Air Refueling Wing on 19 October 1991
 Redesignated 108th Wing on 1 December 2009

Assignments
 New Jersey Air National Guard, 1 November 1950
 40th Air Division, 14 March 1951
 Ninth Air Force, 18 November 1951 – 1 December 1952
 New Jersey Air National Guard, 1 December 1952 – Present
 Gained by: Air Defense Command
 Gained by: Tactical Air Command, 1 July 1958
 Federalized 7108th Tactical Wing assigned to United States Air Forces in Europe, 1 October 1961 – 30 August 1962
 Gained by: Air Combat Command, 1 June 1992
 Gained by: Air Mobility Command, 1 June 1993–Present

Components
 Groups
 103d Tactical Fighter Group, unknown – c. 1 July 1979
 104th Tactical Fighter Group, c. June 1972 – c. 1 July 1979
 108th Fighter Group (later 108th Fighter-Bomber Group, 108th Fighter-Interceptor Group, 108th Tactical Fighter Group, 108th Operations Group), 1 November 1950 – 1 December 1952, 1 December 1952 – 1 October 1958, 1 October 1962 – 9 December 1974, 1 October 1993 – present
 170th Air Refueling Group, 1 October 1991 – 1 October 1993
 174th Tactical Fighter Group, c. June 1972 – 1 July 1979
 175th Tactical Fighter Group, 12 April 1968 – 13 May 1968
 177th Tactical Fighter Group, 15 October 1962 – c. August 1965
 192d Tactical Fighter Group, 15 October 1962 – 1 June 1993

 Squadrons
 119th Fighter-Interceptor Squadron, 1 October 1958 – 15 October 1962 
 149th Fighter Squadron, 1 October 1961 – 17 August 1962
 141st Tactical Fighter Squadron, 1 October 1958 – 1 October 1962
 141st Tactical Fighter Squadron (later 141st Air Refueling Squadron), 9 December 1974 – present

Stations
 Mercer Airport, New Jersey, 1 November 1950
 Turner Air Force Base, Georgia, 1 March 1951
 Godman Air Force Base, Kentucky, 11 December 1951 – 1 December 1952
 McGuire Air Force Base (part of Joint Base McGuire-Dix-Lakehurst), New Jersey, 30 November 1952 – Present
 Operated from: Chaumont-Semoutiers AB, France, 1 October 1961 – 30 August 1962

Aircraft

 Republic F-47D Thunderbolt, 1949–1952
 North American F-51H Mustang, 1952–1955
 North American F-86E Sabre, 1955–1958
 F-84F Thunderstreak, 1958–1962

 F-86H Sabre, 1962–1965
 F-105B Thunderchief, 1965–1981
 F-4D Phantom II, 1981–1985
 F-4E Phantom II, 1985–1991
 KC-135E Stratotanker, 1991–2007
 KC-135R Stratotanker, 2007–Present

References

Notes
 Explanatory notes 
 Deployed to Incirlik AB, Adana, Turkey and attached to a provisional ARW, 1990's

 Citations

Bibliography

 Some of this text in an early version of this article was taken from pages on the 108th Air Refueling Wing website, which as a work of the U.S. Government is presumed to be a public domain resource.
 
 Donald, David. Century Jets: USAF Frontline Fighters of the Cold War''. AIRtime, 2004. .
 
 USAAS-USAAC-USAAF-USAF Aircraft Serial Numbers—1908 to present
 North American P-51H Mustang
 108th Air Refueling Wing: New Jersey Air National Guard
 lineage and history, 108th Air Refueling Wing

Wings of the United States Air National Guard
Military units and formations in New Jersey
Military units and formations established in 2009